The McConnell House, Law Office, and Slave Quarters, near Wurtland, Kentucky, was listed on the National Register of Historic Places in 1975.

It is located west of Wurtland on U.S. Route 23.

It has also been known as Harris House.

It is located on an inlet from the Ohio River.

The listing includes a one-and-a-half-story brick building which originally served as a law office for John McConnell and later as a schoolhouse.

See also 
 Henry Clay's Law Office: NRHP listing in Lexington, Kentucky
 William L. Hurst Law Office: NRHP listing in Campton, Kentucky
 National Register of Historic Places listings in Greenup County, Kentucky

References

National Register of Historic Places in Greenup County, Kentucky
Georgian architecture in Kentucky
Federal architecture in Kentucky
School buildings completed in 1833
Commercial buildings completed in 1833
1833 establishments in Kentucky
Slave cabins and quarters in the United States
African-American history of Kentucky
Legal history of Kentucky
Law offices